The best-selling album in the United Kingdom is Greatest Hits, a compilation album by the British rock band Queen that was first released in 1981. , it has sold more than 7 million copies, of which approximately 124,000 have been from downloads. Queen's second greatest hits album, Greatest Hits II, has sold approximately 4 million copies since being released in 1991, and is the tenth biggest-selling album in the UK. These sales figures include 50% of sales of box sets containing both albums and 33% of sales of box sets of Queen's three Greatest Hits albums.

Of the UK's top 60 best-selling albums, more than half are by British artists. Fourteen are by American artists, with the rest being from Ireland, Canada, Sweden and Jamaica. Ten acts feature on the chart with more than one album, with Queen and Michael Jackson both featuring twice within the top ten. The only acts to feature more than twice are Coldplay, Michael Jackson, Take That and Robbie Williams; Williams features on the chart four times, more than any other artist. The most-represented record label is Parlophone with seven entries, while the decade that appears the most is the 2000s, with 20 of the entries having been released during that period, despite its "general background of declining sales and internet piracy".

According to the Official Charts Company (OCC), which collects album sales data in the UK, an album is defined as being a type of music release that features more than four tracks or is longer than 25 minutes in duration. Sales of albums in the UK were first published by the music magazine Record Mirror, who compiled a weekly chart of the country's five biggest-selling records for the week of 22 July 1956. Record Mirror first number one was Songs for Swingin' Lovers! by Frank Sinatra. Since then, four albums have gone on to sell more than five million copies each: Greatest Hits by Queen, Gold: Greatest Hits by ABBA, Sgt. Pepper's Lonely Hearts Club Band by The Beatles and 21 by Adele. The top nine best-selling albums have each sold at least four million copies. Since 1994, sales of albums have been monitored by the OCC, who took over compiling the weekly UK Albums Chart.

Sales certifications for albums are awarded by the British Phonographic Industry (BPI) for shipments, physical sales and downloads of albums, and, streaming of album tracks. The BPI began awarding certifications soon after it was founded in April 1973. Over the following six years, the thresholds for silver and gold certifications both grew twice – the threshold for platinum certification remained at £1 million. In January 1979, this method of certifying sales was abolished, and certifications were instead based on unit sales to retail outlets: sales of 60,000 were awarded silver, gold for 100,000 and platinum for 300,000. Multi-platinum awards were introduced in February 1987; digital downloads have been counted towards unit sales since 2004. Certifications for albums released before April 1973 were retroactively awarded in August 2013 for sales from 1994 onwards, and then again in February 2016 for all previous sales. The highest-certified album is Greatest Hits, which has been awarded platinum certification 23 times, representing 6,900,000 units.

Best-selling albums
Positions are as of July 2016; sales, where shown, are from the reference given, which may be at a different date, and cannot be used to infer changes in position.

See also

Notes

References
General (chart positions)

Specific

External links
Official UK Albums Top 100 at the Official Charts Company

British music industry
British music-related lists
United Kingdom
Albums, best-selling